ξ Pavonis, Latinised as Xi Pavonis, is a triple star system in the southern constellation of Pavo. It is visible to the naked eye as a faint star with a combined apparent visual magnitude of 4.35 The system is located approximately 440 light-years from the Sun based on parallax, and it is drifting further away with a radial velocity of +12 km/s.

This system forms the double star GLE 2, whose companion's magnitude is 8.6 with a  angular separation, which was discovered by Australian amateur astronomer Walter Gale in 1894. The visible member of this inner pair is an aging giant star with a stellar classification of K4III.

References

K-type giants
Spectroscopic binaries
Triple stars

Pavo (constellation)
Pavonis, Xi
Durchmusterung objects
168339
090098
6855